The 41st Electronic Combat Squadron is a United States Air Force unit.  Its current assignment is with the 55th Electronic Combat Group at Davis–Monthan Air Force Base, Arizona as a geographically separated unit from its parent wing, the 55th Wing at Offutt Air Force Base, Nebraska. It operates the Lockheed EC-130H Compass Call communications-jamming aircraft.

The squadron is one of the oldest in the United States Air Force, its origins dating to 14 June 1917, when it was organized at Kelly Field, Texas.  It served overseas in France as part of the American Expeditionary Forces during World War I.   The squadron also saw combat during World War II, and became part of Tactical Air Command (TAC) during the Cold War.

History

World War I
The squadron's origins date to the 9th Balloon Company of the Observation Balloon Service in World War I, which served with the French 17th and 32nd Army Corps, and the III and IV Army Corps, United States Army, from 16 August – 11 November 1918.

World War II
The squadron provided air defense for Panama Canal, January 1942 – May 1944, with occasional antisubmarine patrols over the Caribbean and Pacific, especially during May and June 1942; deployed to Western Pacific in June 1945, but never entered combat.

Cold War
The squadron was reactivated at Shaw Air Force Base, South Carolina, where it was assigned to the 432d Tactical Reconnaissance Group and equipped with Douglas RB-26 Invader aircraft. In 1956 as deliveries of the Douglas RB-66B Destroyer to the Air Force increased, the squadron was equipped with the newer jet aircraft.

From the 1960s
The unit fought in Southeast Asia, c. November 1965 – 31 October 1969.

The unit was tasked with command, control, and communications countermeasures from 1982 onwards. It flew electronic countermeasures missions from the United Arab Emirates during Operation Desert Shield/Operation Desert Storm from 27 August 1990 – 17 April 1991.

Lineage
 Organized as Company A, 4th Balloon Squadron on 13 November 1917
 Redesignated 9th Balloon Company on 25 July 1918
 Redesignated 9th Airship Company on 30 August 1921
 Redesignated 9th Airship Squadron on 26 October 1933
 Redesignated 1st Observation Squadron on 1 June 1937
 Redesignated 1st Observation Squadron (Medium) on 13 January 1942
 Redesignated 1st Observation Squadron on 4 July 1942
 Redesignated 1st Reconnaissance Squadron (Special) on 25 June 1943
 Redesignated 41st Photographic Reconnaissance Squadron on 25 November 1944
 Redesignated 41st Tactical Reconnaissance Squadron on 24 January 1946
 Inactivated on 17 June 1946
 Redesignated 41st Tactical Reconnaissance Squadron, Night-Photographic on 14 January 1954
 Activated on 18 March 1954
 Inactivated on 18 May 1959
 Redesignated 41st Tactical Reconnaissance Squadron, Photo-Jet and activated on 30 June 1965 (not organized)
 Organized on 1 October 1965
 Redesignated 41st Tactical Reconnaissance Squadron on 8 October 1966
 Redesignated: 41st Tactical Electronic Warfare Squadron on 15 March 1967
 Inactivated on 31 October 1969
 Redesignated 41st Electronic Combat Squadron on 17 June 1980
 Activated on 1 July 1980

Assignments

 Unknown, 13 November 1917
 Balloon Wing, IV Army Corps, 5 August 1918
 Balloon Wing, III Army Corps, 21 September 1918
 Balloon Group, III Army Corps, 8 October 1918
 2d Balloon Group, First Army (United States), c. 20 November 1918 – December 1918
 Unknown, December 1918 – May 1919
 Army Balloon School, Fort Omaha, Nebraska, May 1919
 Fourth Corps Area, October 1921
 1st Airship Group (later 21st Airship Group), 19 July 1922
 Sixth Corps Area, 1 June 1937
 Seventh Corps Area (attached to Cavalry School), 15 June 1937
 Cavalry School, c. 1939
 Second United States Army, 3 October 1940
 Two flights attached to Cavalry School to c. April 1941
 Third flight remained assigned to Cavalry School throughout period
 II Air Support Command, 1 September 1941
 Flight attached to Cavalry School to c. December 1941
 72d Observation Group (later 72d Reconnaissance) Group), 26 September 1941
 Attached to 6th Bombardment Group, 10 April 1942 – c. June 1942
 Sixth Air Force, 1 November 1943
 II Tactical Air Division, 24 May 1944
 III Tactical Air Division, 24 June 1944

 III Tactical Air Command, 1 October 1944
 III Tactical Air Division, 4 December 1944
 7th Fighter Wing, 18 April 1945
 AAF, Pacific Ocean Area (attached to XXI Bomber Command), 13 June 1945
 United States Army Forces, Middle Pacific (attached to Twentieth Air Force), 16 July 1945
 315th Bombardment Wing, 18 September 1945
 VII Fighter Command (later 46th Fighter Wing), 4 January 1946 – 17 June 1946
 432d Tactical Reconnaissance Group, 18 March 1954
 363d Tactical Reconnaissance Wing, 8 February 1958 – 18 May 1959
 Tactical Air Command, 20 June 1965 (not organized
 363d Tactical Reconnaissance Wing, 1 October 1965
 Thirteenth Air Force, 20 October 1965
 460th Tactical Reconnaissance Wing, 18 February 1966
 432d Tactical Reconnaissance Wing, 18 September 1966
 355th Tactical Fighter Wing, 15 August 1967 – 31 October 1969
 552d Airborne Warning and Control Wing (later 552d Airborne Warning and Control Division), 1 July 1980
 28th Air Division, 1 April 1985
 Attached to Air Division Provisional, 15, 5 December 1990 – 17 April 1991
 355th Operations Group, 1 May 1992
 55th Electronic Combat Group, 2006 – Present

Stations

 Fort Omaha, Nebraska, 13 November 1917
 Camp Morrison, Virginia, 9 February 1918 – 29 June 1918
 Camp de Meucon, Morbihan, France, 17 July 1918
 Broussey-Raulecourt, France, 14 August 1918
 Xivray-et-Marvoisin, France, 12 September 1918
 St Benoit-en-Woevre, France, 14 September 1918
 Lamarche-en-Woevre, France, 16 September 1918
 Thierville, France, 22 September 1918
 Cumières, France, 9 October 1918
 Consenvoye, France, 7 November 1918
 Fromeréville-les-Vallons, France, 12 November 1918
 Damvillers, France, 14 November 1918
 Ville-sur-Cousances, France, 26 November 1918
 Colombey-les-Belles, France, 4 February 1919
 Bordeaux, France, 18 February 1919 – 20 April 1919
 Camp Stuart, Virginia, 4 May 1919
 Camp Lee, Virginia, 9 May 1919
 Fort Omaha, Nebraska, 18 May 1919
 Scott Field, Illinois, 28 October 1921

 Fort Omaha, Kansas, 15 June 1937 – 27 December 1941
 Rio Hato, Panama, 14 January 1942
 Howard Field, Panama Canal Zone, 19 January 1942
 David, Panama, 17 April 1942
 Rio Hato, Panama, 10 May 1942
 Howard Field, Panama Canal Zone, 20 June 1942 – 7 May 1944
 Pounds Field, Texas, 24 May 1944
 Muskogee Army Air Field, Oklahoma, 7 December 1944 – 4 April 1945
 Kualoa Field, Hawaii, 18 April 1945 – 31 May 1945
 Agana Airfield, Guam, Mariana Islands 13 June 1945
 Detachment at: North Field (Iwo Jima), Iwo Jima, Bonin Islands (Japan), 9 August 1945 – c. 15 September 1945
 East Field (Saipan), Mariana Islands, 4 January 1946
 Agana Airfield, Guam, Mariana Islands, 15 April 1946 – 17 June 1946
 Shaw Air Force Base, South Carolina, 18 March 1954 – 18 May 1959
 Shaw Air Force Base, South Carolina, 1 October 1965
 Takhli RTAFB, Thailand, 20 October 1965 – 31 October 1969
 Davis–Monthan Air Force Base, Arizona, 1 July 1980 – present
 Deployed at Bateen Air Base, United Arab Emirates, 27 August 1990 – 17 April 1991.

Aircraft
 Type R observation balloon, 1918–1919,
 1919–1921; probably included RN-1 (Zodiac), type SST (Mullion), type AA (pony blimp), A-4, D-4, OA-1, AC-1, TA-1, TA-5, TC-1, TC-3, TC-5, TC-6, TC-10, TC-11, TC-14, TE-1, type TE-3, and TF-1 nonrigid airships, RS-9 semirigid airship, type R (later, C-3) and C-6 observation balloons, and A-6, A-7, and A-8 spherical balloons during period 1922–1937.
 Thomas-Morse O-19, Douglas O-25, and apparently O-46, during period 1937–1939.
 O-47, 1938–1944, L-4 and B-18, 1942–1944,
 P-39, 1943–1944, included Kellett YG-1B, c. 1938–1940, YO-51 Dragonfly, 1940–1941, Bellanca YO-50, and apparently O-59 Grasshopper, 1941, O-49, 1941–1943, and CG-4, 1943; A-20, 1944, primarily F-5 Lightning, 1944–1946.
 Douglas RB-26 Invader, 1954–1956;
 Douglas RB-66 Destroyer, 1956–1959.
 Douglas RB-66 Destroyer, 1965; EB-66, 1965–1969.
 EC-130H Compass Call, 1982–

See also

 French blimps operated by the USN
 U.S. Army airships

References

Notes
Explanatory notes

Footnotes

Bibliography

External links
 https://web.archive.org/web/20100526062159/http://www.wolfsshipyard.mystarship.com/Misc/Airships/Airships.htm

Electronic combat squadrons of the United States Air Force
041
Military units and formations established in 1980
Military units and formations in Arizona